Zalun is a town in Hinthada District in Ayeyawady Region in Myanmar and capital of Zalun Township. Zalun town consists of wards:
Kanna
North Lammadaw
South Lammadaw
San Tan
Nyaungbin Zay

Important sites in Zalun include Pyitawpyan Pagoda, Buddha Andaw, and U Thila Stupa.

Township capitals of Myanmar
Populated places in Ayeyarwady Region